A gas slug is a conglomerate of high pressure gas bubbles that forms within certain volcanoes, the agitation of which is a key driving factor in Strombolian eruptions. They start out as small bubbles of gas inside of volcanic magma. These accumulate into one large bubble, which starts to rise through the lava plume.  

Once this accumulated slug reaches the top of the column and comes in contact with air, it bursts with a loud pop because of the lower air pressure, throwing magma into the air in the typical lava arc of a Strombolian eruption. This type of eruption is episodic, non-damaging to its source vent, and one of the slowest forms of activity, with the ability to sustain itself for thousands of years. 

Although the effect of gas slugs in lava is well understood, how they form is not well understood, but recent research suggests that they can form as deep as  under the surface.

References 

Volcanic degassing
Gas explosions
Thermodynamic processes